César Antonio Crespo (born May 23, 1979) is a former second baseman who last played in the Baltimore Orioles organization. Listed at 5'11, 170 lb., Crespo was a switch-hitter and throws right-handed. He is the younger brother of Felipe Crespo.

Career
Crespo is a 10-year minor league veteran who had brief stints in Major League Baseball with the San Diego Padres (2001–02) and Boston Red Sox (2004). His most productive season came in 2001 with San Diego, when he hit .209 with four home runs (all coming from the left side of the plate) and 12 RBI in 55 games, all career-highs. On June 7 of that year, Crespo and his brother Felipe homered in the same game, joining a select club of major league brothers who have accomplished the same honor. He also won a World Series ring as a member of the 2004 Boston Red Sox (he did not play in the second half of the season, the 2004 playoffs, or the 2004 World Series). 
 
In 132 major league games, Crespo hit .192 (50-for-261) with four home runs and 14 RBI, including 38 runs, 10 doubles, one triple, and 11 stolen bases.

Crespo spent 2007 with the Norfolk Tides of the International League. In 2008, Cesar played with the Puerto Rico Double A (AA) baseball league, for the "Mulos Del Valenciano" de Juncos.

See also
 List of Major League Baseball players from Puerto Rico

References

External links

1979 births
Living people
Boston Red Sox players
Brevard County Manatees players
Capital City Bombers players
Criollos de Caguas players
Gigantes de Carolina players
Indianapolis Indians players
Liga de Béisbol Profesional Roberto Clemente infielders
Liga de Béisbol Profesional Roberto Clemente outfielders
Major League Baseball outfielders
Major League Baseball second basemen
Major League Baseball shortstops
Major League Baseball third basemen
Major League Baseball players from Puerto Rico
Norfolk Tides players
Pawtucket Red Sox players
People from Río Piedras, Puerto Rico
Portland Beavers players
Portland Sea Dogs players
Richmond Braves players
San Diego Padres players